Hibbertia hendersonii is a species of flowering plant in the family Dilleniaceae and is endemic to the Blackdown Tableland in Queensland. It is an erect shrub with densely hairy foliage, narrow elliptic leaves, and yellow flowers, each usually with twenty to thirty-one stamens arranged on one side of the two carpels.

Description
There are as many as twenty-one flowers on each branchlet.

Taxonomy
Hibbertia hendersonii was first formally described in 1991 by Sally T. Reynolds in the journal Austrobaileya from specimens collected on the Blackdown Tableland in 1971. The specific epithet (hendersonii) honours Rodney John Francis Henderson, one of the collectors of the type specimens.

Distribution and habitat

Conservation status
Hibbertia hendersonii is classified as of "least concern" under the Queensland Government Nature Conservation Act 1992.

See also
List of Hibbertia species

References

hendersonii
Flora of Queensland
Plants described in 1991